The number of elections in Iowa varies from year to year.  Presidential elections are held every four years. 

Since 1972, Iowa has been the first state to vote in presidential primaries, with their caucuses.  As with presidential elections, gubernatorial elections are held every four years - but are staggered such that they are held on general elections independently of the presidential election.  Members of the Iowa Senate are elected every four years, with half of the Senate elected at each general election; all members of the Iowa House of Representatives are  elected every two years.  Additionally, elections for various government officials, judicial retention elections, and elections on referendums occur as part of various elections in Iowa.

In a 2020 study, Iowa was ranked as the 24th easiest state for citizens to vote in.

Electoral system

Party system

The Iowa Caucus is an electoral event in which residents meet in precinct caucuses in all of Iowa's 1,681 precincts and elect delegates to the corresponding county conventions.

General elections
In Iowa, a general election is held on Election Day during even-numbered years.  In addition to the elections for the chief executive and legislature of the United States and of Iowa, general elections in Iowa include statewide elections for the Secretary of State, Auditor of State, Treasurer of State, Secretary of Agriculture, and Attorney General.  Also included are judicial retention elections and proposed amendments to the Iowa Constitution, along with various local elections.

Local elections
In Iowa, various local officials are elected at the general election.  However, school and city elections are not held during a general election, but at a different regularly scheduled time.  Regular school elections are held on the second Tuesday in September during odd-numbered years.  Regular city elections are held on Election Day during odd-numbered years.

Special elections
In Iowa, special elections may be held throughout the year to fill various governmental vacancies or to vote on ballot initiatives.  Special elections are generally held on Tuesdays and may not generally be held on the same day as a general or local election.

See also
United States presidential elections in Iowa
2020 Iowa elections

References

External links
Voting and Elections Information at the Iowa Secretary of State official website

 
Iowa election laws - a compilation of Iowa laws related to elections.
Iowa election laws changed pages - an update with those pages changed since the last publication of the Iowa election laws, current as of October 2008.
 
  (State affiliate of the U.S. League of Women Voters)
 . (Also: 1997 & 1998, 1999 & 2000, 2001 & 2002, 2003 & 2004,  2005 & 2006, 2007 & 2008, 2009 & 2010, 2011 & 2012, 2013 & 2014, 2015 & 2016, 2017 & 2018).
 Digital Public Library of America. Assorted materials related to Iowa elections
 

 
Government of Iowa
Political events in Iowa